Marcos Flack (born 8th March 2006), is an Australian racing driver currently competing in the GB3 Championship with Douglas Motorsport, and the Italian F4 Championship with R-ace GP.

He is the son of former Porsche Carrera Cup Australia Championship amateur driver Damien Flack and is currently coached by British Touring Car Championship driver Dan Cammish.

Career

Karting
Flack made his karting debut in 2011 in the Bambino Queensland Cup, which he won in that year and in 2012. In 2014, he became a factory driver for CRG, and began karting internationally alongside in Australia. In 2016, he won the Macau International Kart Grand Prix, and began competing in World Series Karting the same year. Switching to the Energy Course team in 2019, Flack won in the IAME International Final in the Junior ROK category, and also competed in the FIA European Karting European Championship in the OK Junior class in this year. 

In 2020, Flack was announced as one of two drivers to be representing Asia, Pacific and Oceania at the Ferrari Driver Academy scouting world final, alongside James Wharton. He was a finalist in the event.

Formula 4
Prior to his competitive debut in 2021, Flack spent time in New Zealand in 2020 working as an engineer in the Toyota Racing Series to understand the mechanical side of racing better. 

Flack made his car racing debut in the 2021 F4 British Championship driving for Phinsys by Argenti, following his participation in official British F4 tests in 2020 and tests with MTEC Motorsport. He also competed in select rounds of ADAC Formula 4 and the Italian F4 Championship. He finished 11th in the British F4 season, with 3 overall podiums.

He moved to R-ace GP for his first full season in Italian F4 in 2022, and also competed in the Spa-Francorchamps round of ADAC Formula 4. 

Flack returned to British F4 in the 2022 season from Round 9, driving for Fortec Motorsports.

GB3 Championship
Flack made his debut in the GB3 Championship in 2022, driving for Douglas Motorsport alongside Max Esterson and Tommy Smith. He achieved his first podium during Race 3 at the Snetterton round, and his first win during Race 3 at the second Silverstone Circuit round.

Indy Pro 2000
Flack joined Jay Howard Racing Development for the final two rounds of the 2022 Indy Pro 2000 Championship. With a best finish of 4th, he finished 17th in the standings.

Karting record

Karting career summary

Racing record

Racing career summary

† As Flack was a guest driver, he was ineligible for championship points.
* Season still in progress.

Complete F4 British Championship results
(key) (Races in bold indicate pole position) (Races in italics indicate fastest lap)

Complete Italian F4 Championship results
(key) (Races in bold indicate pole position) (Races in italics indicate fastest lap)

Complete GB3 Championship results
(key) (Races in bold indicate pole position) (Races in italics indicate fastest lap)

American open-wheel racing results

Indy Pro 2000 Championship
(key) (Races in bold indicate pole position) (Races in italics indicate fastest lap) (Races with * indicate most race laps led)

* Season still in progress.

References

External links
 
 
 Driver Profile at GB3

2006 births
Living people
Sportsmen from Queensland
Australian racing drivers
Racing drivers from Queensland
BRDC British Formula 3 Championship drivers
Italian F4 Championship drivers
R-ace GP drivers
People from Brisbane
ADAC Formula 4 drivers
Spanish F4 Championship drivers
Van Amersfoort Racing drivers
Cram Competition drivers
British F4 Championship drivers
Indy Pro 2000 Championship drivers
Fortec Motorsport drivers
21st-century Australian people